The Corps Saxo-Borussia Heidelberg is a German Student Corps at the University of Heidelberg.

History 
Saxo-Borussia was established on 16 December 1820. Its motto is Virtus sola bonorum corona!. In 1829 Robert Schumann became a lifelong member. During the Revolutions of 1848 in the German states the corps participated in founding the Kösener Senioren-Convents-Verband (KSCV), an association of German-speaking Student Corps.

In the German Empire and in the Weimar Republic Saxo-Borussia was considered "the most distinguished corps of Christendom" – a reference to the 1st Foot Guards (German Empire). Wilhelm Meyer-Förster wrote a student novel (1885) and Mark Twain reported on his visit in A Tramp Abroad. Kurt Tucholsky taunted the corps with a poem. Unlike the befriended Corps Borussia Bonn, Saxo-Borussia has never been mocked by satirical magazine Simplicissimus. The group was prosecuted in Nazi Germany. It dissolved on 3 July 1935 under persecution, and was recreated in 1952. In 1910 and 1998 it headed the KSCV.

Members

Princes 
 Frederick II, Grand Duke of Baden
 Prince Maximilian of Baden
 Constantine I of Greece
 Prince Oskar of Prussia
 Charles Augustus, Hereditary Grand Duke of Saxe-Weimar-Eisenach (1844–1894)
 Ernst I, Duke of Saxe-Altenburg
 Otto of Stolberg-Wernigerode

Others 
 Herbert von Dirksen, ambassador to Britain
 Albrecht von Hagen, executed in 1944
 Hermann Theodor Hettner,  literary historian
 William Hillebrand, physician and botanist in Hawaii
 Leopold von Hoesch, esteemed diplomat in England
 Joseph Florimond Loubat, bibliophile, antiquarian, sportsman, and philanthropist
 Eduard von Rindfleisch, pathologist
 Hans Joachim von Rohr, agrarian
 Rudolf von Scheliha, executed in 1942
 Gustav Simon, surgeon

Riesenstein 

Saxo-Borussia is also known for her Corpshouse called Riesenstein. It is located nearby the Gaisberg (Heidelberg).

See also 
 Junker (Prussia)
 List of members of German student corps
 The Student Prince

Further reading 
 Lees Knowles: A day with corps-students in Germany
 Heinz-Adolf von Brand und Maxtheodor Reichmann (Hg.): Beiträge zur Geschichte der Saxo-Borussia zu Heidelberg, vol. 1: 1820–1935. Heidelberg 1958.
 Rosco Weber: The German Corps in the Third Reich. Macmillan, London 1986
 Robert von Lucius (ed.): Weiß–Grün–Schwarz–Weiß. Beiträge zur Geschichte des Corps Saxo-Borussia zu Heidelberg, vol. 2: 1934–2008. Heidelberg 2008.
 Thomas Weber: Our Friend "The Enemy". Elite Education in Britain and Germany before World War I. Stanford University Press 2008. GoogleBooks
 Stephen Klimczuk, Gerald Warner: Secret Places, Hidden Sanctuaries: Uncovering Mysterious Sights, Symbols, and Societies, Sterling Publishing Company, 2009, p. 224-232 (The German University Corps)

External links

 Gregor Samarow: Die Saxo-Borussen. Stuttgart 1885 (Projekt Gutenberg)
 List of notable members (German Wikipedia)

References 

Saxo-Borussia Heidelberg, Corps
Heidelberg University alumni
Student organizations established in 1820
1820 establishments in Germany